The Red Arrow was a night train operated by the Pennsylvania Railroad that ran from New York City to Detroit. It had an additional section going to and from Washington, D.C.  This was an unusual train, in that the PRR had few trains that ran to Detroit. More of the PRR trains went west to Chicago or St. Louis. The Red Arrow became the premier PRR train on the New York -  Detroit circuit.

History
The train began as an eastbound-only train, from Detroit to Pittsburgh in 1925. In the next year it went in both directions, #69, westbound, #68 eastbound. By 1938. the train was extended to New York and Washington, with the route split at Harrisburg, Pennsylvania. The Detroit terminus was the Fort Street Union Depot in downtown Detroit.

Route
Going south from Detroit, the route went through Toledo, Ohio, joined the PRR main line at Mansfield, Ohio, and continued east. In the easterly direction the train made a stop in Canton, Ohio. In the westbound direction the train made no stops between Pittsburgh and Mansfield.

Derailment
On February 18, 1947, the eastbound Red Arrow was derailed at Bennington Curve near Gallitzin, Pennsylvania, killing 22 of the 200 people on board at the time. The cause of the accident was determined to be excessive speed around the curve, derailing the two K4s steam locomotives and many of the passenger cars.

Demise
Between April 29, 1956 and July 26, 1959 the route was shrunk in steps, eventually to a local train between Detroit and Toledo. It had its last run on July 26, 1960.

References

Named passenger trains of the United States
Night trains of the United States
Passenger trains of the Pennsylvania Railroad
Railway services discontinued in 1960
Passenger rail transportation in Pennsylvania
Passenger rail transportation in Maryland
Passenger rail transportation in New York (state)
Passenger rail transportation in New Jersey
Passenger rail transportation in Ohio
Passenger rail transportation in Michigan